Giordano Bruno is a  lunar impact crater on the far side of the Moon, just beyond the northeastern limb. It lies in an area that can be viewed during a favorable libration, although the area is viewed from the side and not much detail can be seen. It lies between the craters Harkhebi to the northwest and Szilard to the southeast.

When viewed from orbit, Giordano Bruno is at the center of a symmetrical ray system of ejecta that has a higher albedo than the surrounding surface. The outer rim of the crater is especially bright compared to its surroundings. To all appearances, this is a young formation that was created in the relatively recent past, geologically speaking. Based on photos from a lunar orbiter, the crater's age has been estimated at 4 million years.

This feature was named after Italian intellectual Giordano Bruno.

Formation 

Five monks from Canterbury reported to the abbey's chronicler, Gervase, that shortly after sunset on 18 June 1178, they saw "the upper horn [of the moon] split in two". Furthermore, Gervase writes:

In 1976, the geologist Jack B. Hartung proposed that this described the formation of the crater Giordano Bruno.

Modern theories predict that a (conjectural) asteroid or comet impact on the Moon would create a plume of ejecta rising up from the surface, which is consistent with the monks' description. The impact would be expected to perturb the Moon's motions, and laser rangefinding measurements of its libration in longitude were judged to be of the expected magnitude for such an event. In addition, the location recorded fits in well with the crater's location. Additional evidence of Giordano Bruno's youth is its spectacular ray system. The ratio of the length of these rays to the diameter of the crater is the largest for a large crater on the moon, suggesting it is the youngest such crater. Because micrometeorites constantly rain down, they kick up enough dust to quickly (in geological terms) erode a ray system.

However, these observations do not resolve the question of the crater's age. The expected odds of formation of a lunar crater of that size in the last 3,000 years are on the order of 0.1%. The impact creating the 22-km-wide crater would have kicked up  of debris, triggering a week-long, blizzard-like meteor storm on Earth – yet no accounts of such a noteworthy storm of unprecedented intensity are found in any known historical records, including the European, Chinese, Arabic, Japanese and Korean astronomical archives. This discrepancy is a major objection to the theory that Giordano Bruno was formed at that time. Also, much older craters, e.g., Tycho at 108 million years and Copernicus at an estimated 800 million years, still have prominent ray systems.

High-resolution images obtained by the Japanese satellite SELENE in 2008 were used to date the crater by counting the smaller craters within it and its ejecta deposits. This gave an age of  million years, much too old for the hypothesis.

This raises the question of what the monks saw. An alternative theory holds that the monks just happened to be in the right place at the right time to see an exploding meteor coming at them and aligned with the Moon. This would explain why the monks were the only people known to have witnessed the event; such an alignment would only be observable from a specific spot on the Earth's surface.

See also 
 5148 Giordano, asteroid

References

Sources

External links 

 AS08-12-2209, an excellent oblique view of the ray system with Lomonosov in the foreground, from Apollo 8
 Lunar probe Kaguya overflight of Giordano Bruno crater (video)
 Giordano Bruno, The Big Picture, LRO Featured Image, 26 June 2012 
 Outside of Giordano Bruno, LRO Featured Image, 25 August 2011

Impact craters on the Moon
Giordano Bruno
12th century in science